HD 153053 is double star in the southern constellation of Ara. The brighter component is an A-type main sequence star that may be evolving into a subgiant. It has a twelfth magnitude visual companion at an angular separation of 24.7″ along a position angle of 52°. Mostly likely the two are isolated stars that happen to lie near the same line of sight.

This star displays an excess emission of infrared radiation, suggesting the presence of an disk of dusty debris. This disk is orbiting at a radius of 49 AU from the host star.

References

External links
 HR 6297
 CCDM J17001-5436
 Image HD 153053

Ara (constellation)
Double stars
A-type subgiants
Durchmusterung objects
153053
083187
6297